Qaleh-ye Khalil (also Romanized as Qal‘eh-ye Khalīl; also known as Ghal‘eh Khalil, Qal‘eh Nau, Qal‘eh Now, Qal‘eh Now ‘Askar, Qal‘eh Now-e Khalīl, and Qal‘eh-ye Khalīlī) is a village in Choghamish Rural District, Choghamish District, Dezful County, Khuzestan Province, Iran. At the 2006 census, its population was 249, in 49 families.

References 

Populated places in Dezful County